The Railway Square road overbridge is a heritage-listed road overbridge carrying George Street over the former Darling Harbour goods railway line at Railway Square in the Sydney central business district, in the City of Sydney local government area of New South Wales, Australia. The property was added to the New South Wales State Heritage Register on 2 April 1999.

History 

On 26 September 1855, the day of the opening of the first passenger rail line between Sydney and Parramatta, the direct goods line from the Sydney Yard to the Darling Harbour wharves and goods yard was also opened. As part of this line the tracks ran under Parramatta Road through a sandstone arched overbridge designed by the engineer William Randle. The day marked the beginning of the railway in colonial New South Wales, and represented its two main functions: transporting people and transporting goods. The interaction of the railway and the shipping at Darling Harbour was an important factor in expanding the available markets for agricultural and manufactured goods for both import and export trade. It allowed for goods to be brought from ever-further parts of NSW as the rail network expanded. These goods could then be loaded directly onto ships for intrastate, interstate and international markets.

In 1854 the private company was taken over by the government, due largely to a lack of funds and increasing political pressure to complete the first sections as promised.

The original sections of the overbridge at Railway Square are the oldest remaining pieces of railway infrastructure on the NSW system and the last large-scale (possibly only) pieces of infrastructure built by the Sydney Railway Company. The overbridge also remains as one of few tangible reminders of the original Sydney Station complex.

Aerial photographs from 1943 show that the goods line tunnel (it was becoming a tunnel as overbridges were added and extended) was open for a section in Railway Square between Lee Street and George Street South. The double lines through the tunnel were gauntleted to deal with the lack of clearance when they were electrified in 1956.

The most recent sections of the tunnel are concrete and were constructed  when the new Department of Immigration office tower was built in Lee Street.

In 1986 the Darling Harbour goods yard was closed and Darling Harbour was rebuilt as an entertainment and conference facility. The line remained open to allow trains to run through to the Rozelle yard which itself was closed in 1997. Parts of the tunnel extensions (the brick vaulted sections) have since been propped using steel frames and braces to support the increasing weight of the road traffic above.

Subsequently, a pedestrian pathway was created, using a section of the railway track, from where the track exited the tunnel of the overbridge, at the north-western end. In 2012 this pathway was named The Goods Line.

Description 
It was constructed by the Sydney Railway Company, the private interest group that formed in 1848 with the backing of the New South Wales Legislative Council. William Randle, who had arrived in 1852 with the company's new Engineer-in-Chief, James Wallace, was placed in charge of construction.

The first section of the Railway Square overbridge completed was an arched sandstone overbridge, which remains in the centre of the current tunnel. To the east and west the first extensions included sandstone walls with a brick vaulted ceiling. Later extensions to the east and west were completed in brick and concrete. The approach from the southeast is via a brick-lined cutting which dates from pre-1885. The two brick vaulted sections are propped with steel bracing frames. The first section was completed in 1855, the west extension , the southeast extension , and steel bracing added to support the original stone section .

In  George Street South was extended to join Regent Street. The new section was named Lee Street and necessitated the extension of the overbridge to the east. Both these extensions were constructed using sandstone for the walls and vaulted arched brickwork.

The tunnel and original overbridge are in good to moderate condition. There is evidence of damp and some cracking of masonry. Mortar is missing from the portions of the original sandstone section. The roofs of the two immediately adjacent sections, being the brick vaulted extensions, are braced with steel framing.

Significance

The Ultimo (Railway Square) overbridge is of state significance as the oldest surviving structure on the NSW railway system and possibly the only surviving example of the work of the Sydney Railway Company. Opened in 1855, it has a direct and tangible link to the first phase of railway construction in NSW and to the Darling Harbour Goods Yard. The overbridge is associated with William Randle, the first engineer in charge of construction on the NSW railways. The various extensions to the overbridge which together form the current tunnel demonstrate the changing technologies and designs used in railway engineering. The sandstone ceilings blackened from the soot and steam of the steam trains that used it are an evocative reminder of the steam era. The overbridge has a strong connection to the original Sydney Station and is a rare example of the first phase of railway construction in NSW.

Heritage listing 

Railway Square road overbridge was listed on the New South Wales State Heritage Register on 2 April 1999.

Gauntlet track 
Insufficient clearances for overhead wires of 1500V DC electrification in the 1950s required the double track under this bridge to be singled as gauntlet track. This required no turnouts.

Gallery

See also 

List of bridges in Sydney
The Goods Line

References

Attribution

External links

New South Wales State Heritage Register
Former railway bridges in Australia
Road bridges in New South Wales
Articles incorporating text from the New South Wales State Heritage Register
Railway Square, Sydney
1855 establishments in Australia
Bridges completed in 1855
Bridges in Sydney